Ravi Kannan R is an Indian Surgical oncologist based in Assam, India. He is the Director of Cachar Cancer Hospital and Research Centre (CCHRC), a nonprofit hospital that treats cancer patients, and the former Head of Department of surgical oncology at Adyar Cancer Institute in Chennai. He is the recipient of Padma Shri, India's fourth highest civilian honour.

Education
Kannan graduated with a MBBS degree from the Kilpauk Medical College in Chennai and holds a master of surgery degree in surgical oncology from Maulana Azad Medical College, New Delhi.

Career
Kannan was heading the surgical oncology department of Adyar Cancer Institute. In 2006, he visited the Cachar Cancer Hospital and Research Centre for the first time for a consultation on the request of a colleague and that's when he met the then director of CCHRC who offered him to head the centre. Kannan left his practice in Chennai and moved to Assam with his family in 2007 to provide basic healthcare facilities to the people of Barak Valley through Cachar Cancer Hospital and Research Centre in Silchar.

Awards
Padma Shri - 4th highest civilian award of India, was given to him on 26 January 2020.
Mahaveer award in medicine was given to him in 2013.

References 

Living people
Padma Shri Award
Year of birth missing (living people)